UV-328 (2-(2H-benzotriazol-2-yl)-4,6-di-tert-pentylphenol) is a chemical compound that belongs to the phenolic benzotriazoles. It is a UV filter that is used as an antioxidant for plastics.

Properties 
UV-328 has a melting point of 80-86 °C, a vapor pressure of 4,6·10−5 Pa (20 °C) and a water solubility of < 0,001 g·l−1 (20 °C).

Applications 
UV-328 is a light stabilizer for a variety of plastics and other organic substrates. Its use is recommended for the stabilization of styrene homopolymers and copolymers, acrylic polymers, unsaturated polyesters, polyvinyl chloride, polyolefins, polyurethanes, polyacetals, polyvinyl butyral, elastomers and adhesives. It protects polymers and organic pigments from UV radiation and helps maintain the original appearance and physical integrity of moldings, films, sheets and fibers during outdoor weathering. The application concentration is 0.1-1 %.

UV-328 is recommended for applications such as automotive coatings, industrial coatings, commercial inks such as wood stains or do-it-yourself inks.

Hazard 
UV-328 is persistent, bioaccumulative and toxic (PBT) as well as very persistent and very bioaccumulative (vPvB). Thus, it is in the list of substances of very high concern. It may cause long lasting harmful effects to aquatic life.

UV-328 has been found to be associated with adverse health effects in mammals based on repeated-dose toxicity studies conducted in rats and dogs, with the primary health effect being liver toxicity. It is also associated with adverse effects on the kidney based on the study in rats.

The finding of UV-328 in plastics sampled on remote beaches, in stomachs of seabirds and in preen gland oil show that it is also transported over long distances and is taken up by biota. Detections in Arctic biota include eggs of common eider, kittiwake, European shag and glaucous gull as well as the livers of mink.

References 

Benzotriazoles
Phenyl compounds
Antioxidants